The Kenai Mountains (Dena'ina: Yaghanen Dghili) are a mountain range in the U.S. state of Alaska. They extend 192 km (120 mi) northeast from the southern end of the Kenai Peninsula to the Chugach Mountains, and have an average elevation of 3,000 to 5,000 feet.

The Harding and Sargent Icefields, as well as the many glaciers that emanate from them, originate in the Kenai Mountains. Several prime fish-producing rivers, including the Kenai River and the Russian River, also flow from the mountains.

The Dena'ina call the mountains Yaghanen Dghili, meaning "good land mountains". The name "Kenai" was first published by Constantin Grewingk in 1849, who obtained his information from I. G. Wosnesenski's account of a voyage to the area in 1842.

Gallery

References
 

Notes

Kenai Fjords National Park
Kenai Mountains-Turnagain Arm National Heritage Area
Mountain ranges of Alaska
Mountains of Kenai Peninsula Borough, Alaska